Donaubach is a short river in Donaueschingen, Baden-Württemberg, Germany. It flows from the source of the Danube to the Brigach.

See also
List of rivers of Baden-Württemberg
River Breg

Rivers of Baden-Württemberg
Rivers of Germany

de:Donauquelle#Theorien zu den Quellflüssen